Greter is a surname. Notable people with the surname include:

Melanie Greter, Swiss neuroimmunologist
Otto Greter (born 1910), Swiss fencer
Johan Greter (1900–1975), Dutch equestrian